Selin Saime Hizli (also credited as Seline Hizli) (born 1989) is an English actress from Flamstead, Hertfordshire, best known for her starring role in the second and third series of the BBC One drama Land Girls.

Early life and education
Hizli was born in Oxford, Oxfordshire and raised in Flamstead in Hertfordshire. Her mother, Liz Hizli, is a community fundraiser. As a child Hizli attended Roundwood Park School in Harpenden followed by  the BRIT School in Croydon. After a four-stage application process, she was one of only 34 young actors to be accepted for a place at the Royal Academy of Dramatic Art in 2007 to do a three-year acting degree. She graduated in July 2010.

Career
After graduating from the Royal Academy, Hizli won the part of Connie Carter in the second series of the BBC One wartime drama Land Girls. To prepare for the role, she researched the work of the Women's Land Army. She returned to the series for its third run of episodes in 2011.

In September 2011, Hizli appeared as Mae West in Appropriate Adult, a two-part drama based on the events surrounding the arrest of serial killer Fred West. Later in the year she also appeared in an episode of the sixth series of Law & Order: UK. Hizli's first professional stage role was the part of Katie in the play One Night in November at the Belgrade Theatre, Coventry. Further credits include a starring role as The Bride in an adaptation of Federico García Lorca's Blood Wedding which was performed at the 2012 London Festival Fringe. She has also appeared as Amelia in the play The House of Bernarda Alba, also by Federico García Lorca, which was performed between 19 January and 10 March 2012 at the Almeida Theatre, London.

Filmography

References

External links
 

Date of birth missing (living people)
Living people
1989 births
Actresses from Hertfordshire
Actresses from Oxfordshire
Alumni of RADA
English people of Turkish descent
English television actresses
People from Flamstead
Actors from Oxford